Eugene Antonio "Geno" Hayes (August 10, 1987 – April 26, 2021) was an American professional football player who was a linebacker in the National Football League (NFL). After playing college football for the Florida State Seminoles, he was selected by the Tampa Bay Buccaneers in the sixth round of the 2008 NFL Draft. He also played for the Chicago Bears and Jacksonville Jaguars in the NFL.

High school career
A native of Greenville, Florida, Hayes attended Madison County High School, where he played football and ran track. As a junior in 2003, he posted 130 tackles, 20 tackles for a loss, 19 sacks and three interceptions. Madison County finished as the Class 2A state runner up to Chaminade-Madonna College Preparatory School that year. In his senior year, he added 124 stops with 27 for loss and 11 sacks. Madison County again finished as the Class 2A state runner up when they were upset 17–15 by Immokalee High School. Hayes earned All-America first-team honors from Parade Magazine, and second-team USA Today All-America honors. He also starred in track & field, competing in the 110 hurdles and 300 hurdles.

Hayes was listed as a four-star recruit by Rivals.com, and ranked as the No. 3 outside linebacker prospect of his class, behind only Tray Blackmon and Ryan Reynolds. Recruited by dozens of schools, Hayes took official visits to Georgia, Tennessee, Clemson, and Florida State. He committed to FSU on February 2, 2005, and was the seventh-highest graded recruit of the Seminoles' 2005 recruiting class, and the second-highest linebacker behind Derek Nicholson.

College career
In his true freshman season, Hayes played in all 13 games and was credited with 17 tackles, broke up one pass and had two quarterback hurries. While he played mostly on special teams, Hayes also saw time as a back-up for A. J. Nicholson at weakside linebacker. In a game at Clemson in November 2005, Hayes recorded a season-high three tackles and scored Florida State's only touchdown of the game, recovering a blocked punt in the endzone. He also had three tackles in the Orange Bowl loss to Penn State.

With the graduation of Nicholson in 2006, Hayes replaced him at the weakside linebacker position, starting 10 of Florida State's 13 games. He only missed three games (Maryland, Boston College, Virginia) because of a knee injury suffered in the Seminoles' victory over Duke. He ranked fifth on the team in tackles with a career-high 59 stops despite missing three full games and most of the game against Duke when he suffered two sprained ligaments in his right knee while making a tackle in the first quarter. He also ranked third on the team with a career-high 12.0 tackles for minus yardage, behind Lawrence Timmons (18.0) and Everette Brown (13.5). In the Seminoles' Emerald Bowl win against UCLA, Hayes had a career-high of 12 tackles.

In his junior year, Hayes took over a leadership role in the Seminoles linebacker corps, after the graduation of Timmons and Buster Davis. Starting a weakside linebacker, he ranked second on the team in tackles (80) behind Derek Nicholson (99), first in tackles-for-loss (17.5), and second in quarterback sacks (5.0) behind Everette Brown (6.5). He was a first-team All-Atlantic Coast Conference pick.

Professional career
Described as a “smallish, athletic linebacker who makes plays all over the field,” Hayes was projected to be a fourth-round draft pick by Sports Illustrated. He was drafted in the sixth round (175th overall) in 2008.

Tampa Bay Buccaneers
In his rookie year, Hayes appeared in nine games, mostly on special teams. In 2009, he started at weakside linebacker, replacing Derrick Brooks.

Chicago Bears
Hayes signed with the Chicago Bears to a one-year deal on April 19, 2012.

Jacksonville Jaguars
Hayes signed a two-year, $2 million contract with the Jacksonville Jaguars on March 13, 2013.

Personal life and death 

On April 22, 2021, Hayes entered hospice care at his parents' home due to chronic liver disease with which he had been diagnosed two years earlier. He died at age 33 on April 26, 2021. Hayes is survived by his wife Shevelle, his son Gemarri, and his daughter Skylar. He was buried in Evergreen Cemetery in Greenville.

References

External links

Florida State Seminoles bio
Tampa Bay Buccaneers bio
Chicago Bears bio

1987 births
2021 deaths
American football linebackers
Chicago Bears players
Florida State Seminoles football players
Jacksonville Jaguars players
People from Greenville, Florida
Players of American football from Florida
Tampa Bay Buccaneers players
Deaths from liver disease